Uptown is a 1990 jazz album by André Previn, Mundell Lowe and Ray Brown.

Track listing
All tracks composed by Harold Arlen; except where noted.
 "Between the Devil and the Deep Blue Sea" (4:42)
 "A Sleepin' Bee" (5:13)
 "Come Rain or Come Shine"  (4:10)
 "Stormy Weather" (4:33)
 "Over The Rainbow" (4:36)
 "Let's Fall in Love" (3:21)
 "Day Dream / Prelude to a Kiss" (Billy Strayhorn, Duke Ellington, Irving Gordon, Irving Mills, John Latouche) (4:43)
 "Good Queen Bess" (Johnny Hodges) (4:21)
 "Things Ain't What They Used to Be" (Mercer Ellington, Ted Persons) (4:19)
 "It Don't Mean a Thing (If It Ain't Got That Swing)" (Duke Ellington, Irving Mills) (3:05)
 "Five O' Clock Whistle" (Gene Irwin, Josef Myrow, Kenny Gannon) (5:29)
 "Come Sunday" (Duke Ellington) (4:11)
 "C Jam Blues" (Duke Ellington) (4:51)

Personnel
 André Previn - piano
with:
 Mundell Lowe - guitar
 Ray Brown - double bass
Technical
Jack Renner - recording

References

1990 albums
André Previn albums
Telarc Records albums